List by Family Name: A - B - C - D - E - F - G - H - I - J - K - M - N - O - R - S - T - U - W - Y - Z

 Tachihara Masaaki (January 21, 1926 – August 12, 1980)
 Tachihara Michizō (July 30, 1914 – March 29, 1939)
 Tada Chimako (April 1, 1930 – January 23, 2003)
 Taguchi Ukichi (1855–1905)
 Takagi Akimitsu (September 25, 1920 – September 9, 1995)
 Takahama Kyoshi (February 22, 1874 – April 8, 1959)
 Takahashi Genichiro (born 1951)
 Takahashi Kazumi (1931–1971)
 Takahashi Motokichi (1893–1965)
 Takahashi Mutsuo (born December 15, 1937)
 Takahashi Takako (born 1932)
 Takami Jun (January 30, 1907 – August 17, 1965)
 Takami Koushun (born 1960)
 Takamura Kotaro (March 13, 1883 – April 2, 1956)
 Takano Tsugi (August 15, 1890 – March 19, 1943)
 Takayama Chogyu (February 28, 1871 – December 24, 1902)
 Takemoto Novala (born 1968)
 Takeyama Michio (July 17, 1903 – June 15, 1984)
 Tamura Ryuichi (born 1926)
 Tamura Taijiro (1911–1983)
 Tamura Toshiko (1884–1945)
 Tanaka Hidemitsu (January 10, 1913 – November 3, 1949)
 Tanaka Jun (1890–1960)
 Tanaka Yoshiki (born 1952)
 Taneda Santoka (December 3, 1882 – October 11, 1940)
 Tanemura Suehiro (March 21, 1933 – August 29, 2004)
 Tanigawa Nagaru (born 1970)
 Tanikawa Shuntaro (born 1931)
 Tanizaki Junichiro (1886–1965)
 Tatsuhiko Takimoto (born 1978)
 Tawada Yoko (born 1960)
 Tawara Machi (born 1962)
 Tayama Katai (January 22, 1872 – May 13, 1930)
 Terada Kenji (born 1952)
 Terada Torahiko (November 28, 1878 – December 31, 1935)
 Terayama Shuji (December 10, 1935 – May 4, 1983)
 Tokai Sanshi (December 2, 1852 – September 25, 1922)
 Tokuda Shusei (December 23, 1871 – November 18, 1943)
 Tokutomi Roka (October 25, 1868 – September 18, 1927)
 Tomioka Makoto (January 1, 1897 – October 15, 1926)
 Tow Ubukata (born 1977)
 Tsubouchi Shoyo (May 22, 1859 – February 28, 1935)
 Tsuji Jun (October 4, 1884 – November 24, 1944)
 Tsuji Kunio (September 24, 1925 – July 29, 1999)
 Tsunku (born 1968)
 Tsunashima Ryosen (May 27, 1873 – September 14, 1907)
 Tsutsui Yasutaka (born 1934)

T